The American Flag Football League is a semi-professional flag football league started in 2017. The league was founded by Jeff Lewis in May 2017. Lewis spent nine months building the league, getting investors, setting the rules, and finding players and broadcasting partners. The league has signed a deal to air its games on the NFL Network.

Rules

General rules
 7-on-7, with 12-man roster
 60-minute game
 1st half: 30 minutes total; running clock for the first 29 minutes and in the final minute, clock stops only for scoring plays and penalties
 2nd half: 30 minutes total; running clock for the first 28 minutes and traditional clock stoppage for the final two minutes
 Field will be divided into four 25-yard boxes, and first downs are awarded each time the offense reaches the next box
 No blocking, no kicking, no fumbles Kickoffs are replaced with a long throwoff. No touchbacks.
 Only 1 lateral allowed per play; 2 laterals on throw off and punt returns
 Incidental contact is permitted
Winners moves on to the next round, losers are eliminated in a knockout tournament.

Post-snap
 Once the ball is snapped, the defense has to wait two seconds to rush and the quarterback will have a total of four seconds to release the ball or cross the line of scrimmage. Laterals turns the Go clock off as the ball is out of the quarterbacks hands.
 The quarterback cannot run unless rushed
 All players are eligible downfield, except for the designated center on offense, who must stay on the spot to mark the line of scrimmage.
 North-south handoffs are not allowed, but pitches and handoffs to runners running east–west are permitted
 The defense can blitz three times per half without waiting for two seconds

Scoring
 6 pts per touchdown under 50 yards, 7pts for touchdowns over 50 yards
 Teams will have option based on distance to convert PATs of 1, 2 or 3 points. If that pass is picked off, and returned to the opposite endzone, 2 points will be scored.

Penalties
 Most penalties will not award yardage, but rather a free play or loss of down
 Ball will generally go into play at the spot of the foul or the previous spot

Source:

History
Its first official game was an exhibition played between Team Vick (led by former NFL quarterback Michael Vick) and Team Owens (led by former NFL wide receiver Terrell Owens) on June 27, 2017, at Avaya Stadium in San Jose, California and was broadcast live on the league's website and rebroadcast on their official YouTube channel. 

In 2018, the league began formal play with its first US Open of Football tournament. The tournament format was broken into two converging, single-elimination brackets, with 32 teams of primarily amateurs on one side vying for the title of America's Champion and 4 teams of primarily professional gridiron football players on the other. The two champions would then meet in the Ultimate Final to decide the US Open champion. Prior to the US Open, the amateur bracket was narrowed down to 32 teams from a field of 124 teams via regional qualifiers. The winning team will take home a $1,000,000 prize.

Results

Media coverage
In 2018, the league reached a broadcast deal with NFL Network, covering the final 11 games of the U.S. Open of Football tournament. The league is leveraging technologies such as using a skycam as the primary angle, on-field graphics (such as a color-changing line of scrimmage and clock) for the league's "Go Clock" rule, and microphones on players.

References

External links
 Official Website

Flag football
American football leagues in the United States
Sports leagues established in 2017
Professional sports leagues in the United States